Several ships of the French Navy have borne the name Caroline:

See also
 

French Navy ship names